Ten Mile is an unincorporated community in Macon County, in the U.S. state of Missouri.

History
A post office called Ten Mile was established in 1847, and remained in operation until 1902. The community was named after nearby Ten Mile Creek.

References

Unincorporated communities in Macon County, Missouri
Unincorporated communities in Missouri